The Savage Poetry, released in 2000, is a re-recording of the album Savage Poetry, originally launched in 1995 as a demo by German power metal band Edguy. This version is also seen and referred to as their fourth official studio album. The album was originally self-produced and released initially as a demo before the band were signed by AFM. The re-recorded tracks are also slightly re-arranged. Some versions of the album also features the original recording as a bonus disc.

Track listing
All lyrics by Tobias Sammet. All music by Sammet except where noted.

 "Hallowed" - 6:14
 "Misguiding Your Life" - 4:04
 "Key to My Fate" - 4:34
 "Sands of Time" - 4:39
 "Sacred Hell"  - 5:37
 "Eyes of the Tyrant" - 10:00
 "Frozen Candle" (Sammet, Jens Ludwig) - 7:15
 "Roses to No One" - 5:42
 "Power and Majesty" (Sammet, Ludwig) - 4:53

Bonus disc (1995 demo)
 "Key to My Fate" - 4:36
 "Hallowed" - 6:30
 "Misguiding Your Life" - 4:11
 "Sands of Time" - 5:07
 "Sacred Hell" - 6:09
 "Eyes of the Tyrant" - 8:32
 "Frozen Candle" - 7:57
 "Roses to No One" - 5:48
 "Power and Majesty" - 5:10

Personnel
Band members
Tobias Sammet - lead and backing vocals, keyboards
Jens Ludwig - guitar, engineer
Dirk Sauer -  guitar
Tobias 'Eggi' Exxel - bass
Felix Bohnke - drums
Dominik Storch – drums on 1995 version

Additional musicians
Ralf Zdiarstek, Markus Schmitt - backing vocals
Frank Tischer - piano on "Sands of Time"

Production
Norman Meiritz - engineer
Mikko Karmila - mixing
Mika Jussila - mastering

References

2000 remix albums
AFM Records albums
Edguy albums
Albums with cover art by Jean-Pascal Fournier